Xingu Hill is a musical project of musician John Sellekaers. John has released over 60 records on various labels (such as Hushush, Ant-Zen, Hymen Records, Foton, Delikatessen, Mirex, Re-Load Ambient, and Nova Zembla). Sellekaers has also recorded under names such as Dead Hollywood Stars, Ambre, Urawa, Uncotones, Moonsanto and Ammo. He has collaborated with people such as Black Lung, Scorn, The Panacea, Silk Saw and Imminent, and played many shows in Europe and North America.

Xingu Hill began circa 1994 when record label Nova Zembla signed Sellekaers for three albums.

In 2021, Xingu Hill released a retrospective compilation entitled Strange Echoes 95 — 99.

Discography 

 1995 - Maps of the Impossible (Nova Zembla, CD/2x12")
 1996 - Fiction (Nova Zembla, CD/LP)
 1997 - Relay (Nova Zembla, CD)
 1999 - Alterity (Hymen, CD)
 1999 - The Andronechron Incident (with Black Lung) (Ant-Zen, 12")
 2001 - This Anxious Space (with m2 as xhm²) (Hymen, CD)
 2002 - The Andronechron Incident (with Black Lung) (Ant-Zen, CD)
 2003 - 16-bit Golem (Mirex, 7")
 2004 - Unreleased Material (1995–1997) (The Vault, MP3)
 2005 - Altmann's Tongue (with Brian Evenson and Tamarin) (Ant-Zen, CD)
 2021 – Strange Echoes 95 — 99 (Traumgarten, LP/Digital)

References

External links 

Metarc website

Technoid musicians